Thodu Dongalu or Todu Dongalu may refer to:

 Thodu Dongalu (1954 film), a 1954 Telugu film directed by D. Yoganand starring N. T. Rama Rao
 Thodu Dongalu (1981 film), a 1981 Telugu film directed by K. Vasu starring Krishna and Chiranjeevi

See also 

 Thodu Needa, a 1965 Telugu film directed by Adurthi Subba Rao